Asthena sachalinensis is a moth in the family Geometridae. It is found on Sakhalin, the Kuriles and in Japan.

The wingspan is 17–21 mm.

References

Moths described in 1925
Asthena
Moths of Asia